Alexander Mishon (5 July 1858 in Kharkiv – 5 July 1921 near Samara) was a Russian Empire photographer and cinematographer. Born to a French family in Kharkiv, he started his career as a photographer and owned a photo studio in his hometown. He later settled in Baku (nowadays capital of Azerbaijan) and lived there for 25 years. Here, in 1898, he shot his first films using a Lumière cinematograph. Michon is widely regarded as the pioneer of Azerbaijani cinema.

Filmography
 Balaxanida neft fontani (1898) (English: The Oil Gush in Balakhany)
 Balaxanı-Sabunçu polis idarəsi süvari qorodovoyların at oynatmaları (1898)
 Bibiheybatda neft fontani yangini (1898) (English: The Oil Gush Fire in Bibiheybat)
 Alahazrat buxara amirinin 'veliki knyaz Aleksey' paroxodunda yolasalma marasimi (1898) (English: Farewell Ceremony for His Majesty Emir of Bukhara on "Velikiy Kniaz Alexei" Steamboat)
 Ilisdin (1898) (English: You Stumbled)
 Qafqaz raqsi (1898) (English: The Folk Dance of Caucasus)
 Bazar küçasi sübh çag (1898)
 Qafqaz və Merkuri cəmiyyətinin paroxodunun limandan yola düşməsi (1898)
 Qatarin damiryol stansiyasina daxil olmasi (1898) (English:Train Entering the Railroad Station)
 Şəhər bağında xalq gəzintisi (1898)

References

External links 

 

People from the Russian Empire of French descent
Cinema pioneers
Film directors from the Russian Empire
Cinematographers from the Russian Empire
1921 deaths
1858 births